Min jul is a Sanna Nielsen Christmas album, released on 4 November 2013. This is Nielsen's third solo Christmas album, fifth including the joint albums with Shirley Clamp and Sonja Aldén.

Track listing
The album was released in Sweden (physically) and digitally.

 Tracks 2, 3, 6, 8 to 11 taken from the previous album Vinternatten.

References

External links

2013 Christmas albums
Christmas albums by Swedish artists
Pop Christmas albums
Sanna Nielsen albums
Warner Music Group albums